Cee Vee is an unincorporated community in northwestern Cottle County, Texas, United States.  It lies along FM 1440 northwest of the town of Paducah, the county seat of Cottle County.  Its elevation is 1,880 feet (573 m), and it is located at  (34.2231253, -100.4456741).  Although Cee Vee is unincorporated, it has a post office, with the ZIP code of 79223; the ZCTA for ZIP Code 79223 had a population of 35 at the 2000 census.

Cee Vee was founded on the land of the former CV Ranch; after the land was sold in 1927, a post office was opened in 1928.  The postmaster wished to name the post office "CV," but as initials were invalid names for post offices according to departmental guidelines, the letter names were spelled out.  A school opened in the area in 1928 and continued until shortly before 1960.  Cee Vee was long a commercial center for a primarily agricultural area, despite its small size.

References

External links
Profile of Cee Vee from the Handbook of Texas Online

Unincorporated communities in Cottle County, Texas
Unincorporated communities in Texas